The Gulfstream G550 is a business jet aircraft produced by General Dynamics' Gulfstream Aerospace unit in Savannah, Georgia, US. The certification designation is GV-SP.  A version with reduced fuel capacity was marketed as the G500. Gulfstream ceased production of the G550 in July 2021.

Development

The G550 (GV-SP) with improved engines received its FAA type certificate on August 14, 2003. In 2014, Gulfstream looked at a re-engine with the Rolls-Royce Pearl BR700 development announced in May 2018 for the new Global Express 5500 and 6500 variants but preferred the BR725-powered, 7,500 nmi G650. The 500th Gulfstream G550 aircraft was delivered in May 2015.

Deliveries went from 50 aircraft in 2011 to 19 in 2016 and with 40 units for sale in a fleet of 540. Valuations of the G550 are falling: a 10-year-old G550 valued $28 million a year before is worth $18-$20 million in January 2017, while a two-year-old went from $40 to $35 million. In May 2017, early 2003 G550s were valued at $14 million against more than $45 million for newly purchased aircraft, flying an average of 425 hours per year. In December 2018, a 2012-2013 G550 was valued $28-31 million, and cost $7,135 per hour for 400 hours a year.

As it was replaced by the Gulfstream G600 by October 2019, the G550 was kept in limited production for long-term special missions applications and government orders.

The final commercially available G550 was delivered in June 2021 after more than 600 of the aircraft were produced.

Design

A seventh pair of windows is added and the entry door is moved  forward to increase usable cabin length. The PlaneView flight deck features cursor control devices, Honeywell Primus Epic avionics, standard head-up guidance system by Rockwell Collins and enhanced vision system by Elbit, improving situational awareness in reduced visibility conditions.

Flight hourly budget is $700-950 for engine reserves, $250 for parts and 2.5 maintenance hours. It competes against the Bombardier Global 6000, which has higher direct operating costs and less range but a more spacious cross section, and the Dassault Falcon 7X with fly-by-wire flight controls, better fuel efficiency and a wider but shorter cabin.

Variants

The same as the Gulfstream V or GV with a new flightdeck display system, airframe aerodynamic and engine improvements, main entry door moved forward, also marketed as the G-550.
G500
The Gulfstream G500 has a reduced fuel capacity. Introduced in 2004 as a shorter  range version, it has the same exterior appearance, as well as the PlaneView cockpit, but Visual Guidance System (HUD) and Enhanced Vision System (EVS) are options.
G550
Marketing name for the GV-SP. In 2021, its equipped price was $54.5M.

C-37B
U.S. military designation for the G550 in a VIP passenger configuration.
EC-37B
U.S. military designation G550 version in an Electronic Warfare configuration to replace USAF's existing EC-130H Compass Call aircraft.
NC-37B
U.S. military designation for proposed G550 with the "Conformal AEW" body shape for use as range telemetry aircraft for U.S. Navy.
MC-55A Peregrine
Royal Australian Air Force designation for SIGINT and ELINT intelligence gathering variant.

G550 CAEW
Israel has acquired a number of G550s, fitted with the IAI EL/W-2085 sensor package (a newer derivative of the Phalcon system) for Airborne Early Warning (AEW) use and named the aircraft Eitam. This aircraft is heavily modified for the AEW role by Gulfstream's partner, Israel Aerospace Industries (IAI), and is also called CAEW (Conformal Airborne Early Warning) by Gulfstream Special Missions Department. Israel has also acquired a number of G550s dubbed SEMA (Special Electronic Missions Aircraft) with systems EL/I-3001 integration also carried out by IAI. In 2012, Italy acquired two G550 CAEWs as part of a counter-deal to Israel's $1 billion order for 30 Alenia Aermacchi M-346 advanced jet trainers. In 2022, Italy ordered two additional aircraft. Singapore ordered four similar G550 CAEW aircraft equipped with the EL/W-2085 sensor package from Gulfstream and IAI.
E-550A Italian military designation for the G550 CAEW
Air-to-air refueling variant Israel Aerospace Industries has studied adapting the G550 for air-to-air refueling use.

Operators

Civil operators
The aircraft is operated by private individuals, companies and executive charter operators. A number of companies also use the aircraft as part of fractional ownership programs.

Government and military operators

Algerian Air Force – 3 G550s

 In late 2015 the RAAF ordered two Gulfstream G550 aircraft to be delivered by 30 November 2017. The aircraft will be used for SIGINT and ELINT intelligence gathering. It is reported that the aircraft will possibly form the replacement for the electronic intelligence-gathering role performed by two of the RAAF's AP-3 Orions. In June 2017, the sale was approved and the United States confirmed that Australia was interested in purchasing up to five airframes, to be delivered in two tranches from the early 2020s. In March 2019, the Minister for Defence and Minister for Defence Industry in a joint statement announced the procurement of four modified Gulfstream G550 aircraft for use in electronic warfare missions. The aircraft, to be designated MC-55A Peregrine in Australian service, are to be modified in the U.S. and delivered to RAAF Base Edinburgh in a deal worth US$ 1.7 billion.

 German Aerospace Center (DLR) – one G550 special mission aircraft. The aircraft is dubbed HALO (High Altitude and Long Range Research Aircraft). The aircraft's primary objective is to explore the atmosphere and its carbon cycle. Its unique configuration allows a flying altitude of more than 15 kilometers (49,500 feet), a range of more than 8,000 kilometers, and a load capacity of three tons.

 Israeli Air Force  - two Eitam CAEW (Conformal Airborne Early Warning) and Three Shavit SEMA (Special Electronic Missions Aircraft) aircraft

 Italian Air Force - two G550 CAEWs as part of a counter-deal to Israel's $1 billion order for 30 Alenia Aermacchi M-346 advanced jet trainers. Both aircraft delivered and in service as of January 2018. In December 2020 Italy decided to buy additional 8 G550; the first two will be equipped for AISREW (Airborne Intelligence, Surveillance, Reconnaissance, and Electronic Warfare) mission with a L3Harris suite and the remaining six would be delivered as “green” aircraft to be fitted with mission systems at a later date. 
 
 State of Kuwait - one Gulfstream G550 in service for transport of the Royal family.

 Nigerian Air Force - one G550 in service

 Polish Air Force - two G550s in use for VIP transport

 Republic of Singapore Air Force (RSAF) - four G550s with the IAI/ELTA EL/W-2085 active electronically scanned array (AESA) active phased array radar for CAEW duties from Israel Aerospace Industries (IAI). These were delivered in late 2008 and were expected to be fully operational by late 2010. An additional G550 for use as an AEW trainer was to be acquired and maintained by ST Aerospace for the RSAF.

 Swedish Air Force - one G550, designated TP 102D It along with a G-IV designated TP 102A, and a G-IV SP, designated TP 102C, serve as transports for the Royal Family and the Prime Minister.

 Tanzania Government Flight Agency - one G550 in service for VIP transport

 Turkish Armed Forces - two G550 Command and Control aircraft in use

 Government of Uganda - one G550 in use for Presidential flights since February 2009. It replaced a Gulfstream IV-SP that had been in service since 2000.

 United States Air Force – one specially equipped C-37B used as VIP transport including the President
 United States Navy – three C-37Bs in service as VIP transports
 United States Army – one C-37B in use since 2005 as VIP transport.
United States Coast Guard – one C-37B in service as a Long Range Command and Control Aircraft.

Specifications

See also

References

External links

 
 
 

G550
1990s United States business aircraft
Twinjets
T-tail aircraft
Low-wing aircraft
Aircraft first flown in 2004